Oleksandrivka is an urban-type settlement in Odesa Raion of Odesa Oblast in Ukraine. It is located on the right bank of Sukhyi Estuary adjacent to the city of Chornomorsk. Oleksandrivka belongs to Chornomorsk urban hromada, one of the hromadas of Ukraine. Population: 

Until 18 July 2020, Oleksandrivka belonged to Chornomorsk Municipality. The municipality was abolished as an administrative unit in July 2020 as part of the administrative reform of Ukraine, which reduced the number of raions of Odesa Oblast to seven. The area of Chornomorsk Municipality was merged into Odesa Raion.

Economy

Transportation
The closest railway stations, Post 25 km, and Post 22 km, are located in Velykodolynske immediately west of the settlement. They are all on the railway connecting Odesa and Bilhorod-Dnistrovskyi. There is infrequent passenger traffic.

Highway M27 connecting Odesa with Chornomorsk runs through the settlement.

References

Urban-type settlements in Odesa Raion